Braswell Memorial Public Library is a public library in Rocky Mount, North Carolina. Initially organized as the Woman’s Club Library in 1922, in 1923 the library moved into the building which bore the name The Thomas Hackney Braswell Memorial Library. In  2002, the library moved across the street into a new 60,000 square foot facility, and assumed a new identity as an interlocal governmental entity - created and funded by the City of Rocky Mount, Nash County, and Edgecombe County. It is affiliated with and provides administrative support to 5 other local libraries. Recently, it joined the State Library's NC Cardinal consortium of public libraries that share an online catalog and integrated library system that allows it to share books and other materials with member libraries.

Other Locations
 Bailey Public Library (Wesley Privette Memorial) in Bailey, North Carolina
 Harold D. Cooley Library in Nashville, North Carolina (affiliated but independently administered)
 Middlesex Public Library in Middlesex, North Carolina
 Spring Hope Public Library in Spring Hope, North Carolina
 Whitakers Public Library in Whitakers, North Carolina

References

External links

Public libraries in North Carolina
Libraries in North Carolina